Libidibia is a genus of flowering plants in the family Fabaceae. It belongs to the subfamily Caesalpinioideae.

Species
Libidibia comprises the following species:
 Libidibia coriaria (Jacq.) Schltdl.—divi-divi (Mexico, Central America, the Caribbean, northern South America)

 Libidibia ferrea (Mart. ex Tul.) L.P.Queiroz—Brazilian ironwood, leopard tree
 var. ferrea (Mart. ex Tul.) L.P.Queiroz
 var. glabrescens (Benth.) L.P.Queiroz
 var. leiostachya (Benth.) L.P.Queiroz
 var. parvifolia (Benth.) L.P.Queiroz
 Libidibia glabrata (Kunth) C.Cast. & G.P.Lewis

 Libidibia monosperma (Tul.) Gagnon & G.P.Lewis
 Libidibia paraguariensis (D.Parodi) G.P.Lewis—ibirá-berá, guayacaú negro, Argentinian brown ebony (Argentina, Bolivia, Brazil, Paraguay)
 Libidibia punctata (Willd.) Britton—quebrahacha, kibrahacha in Aruba
 Libidibia sclerocarpa (Standl.) Britton & Rose

References

External links 

Caesalpinieae
Fabaceae genera